Café de la plage is a 2001 French film written and directed by Benoît Graffin. The film stars Jacques Nolot, Ouassini Embarek, Leïla Belarbi, Delia Amrani, Meryem Serbah, Mohamed El Hasnaoui, Abdelaziz Semlali, Hind Ramdi.

External links 

2001 films
French comedy-drama films
2000s French films